Last Laugh or The Last Laugh may refer to:

Literature 
 Last Laugh (comics), a DC Comics crossover series featuring the Joker
 The Last Laugh (The Hardy Boys), a novel in the Hardy Boys Casefiles series
 The Last Laugh: a new philosophy of near-death experiences, apparitions, and the paranormal, a 1999 book by Raymond Moody
 "The Last Laugh" (poem), by Wilfred Owen
 Last Laugh, the English-language title of the Japanese play Warai no Daigaku by Mitani Koki
 The Last Laugh, a 2007 play by television writer Richard Harris
 "The Last Laugh" (short story), 1901, by E. W. Hornung

Film 
 The Last Laugh (1924 film), a silent film directed by F. W. Murnau
 The Last Laugh (2016 film), a documentary exploring the ramifications of using the Holocaust as a topic for humor
 The Last Laugh (2019 film), a comedy written and directed by Greg Pritikin

Television episodes
 "The Last Laugh" (Batman: The Animated Series)
 "The Last Laugh", a Ben 10 episode
 "The Last Laugh" (Care Bears episode)
 "Last Laugh" (CSI episode)
 "The Last Laugh" (Diagnosis: Murder)
 "The Last Laugh" (Gotham)
 "Last Laugh" (M*A*S*H)

Music 
 The Last Laugh (album), 1989, by Helios Creed
 The Last Laugh, an album by Joker's Daughter
 "The Last Laugh", a song by Ray Stevens from the album Shriner's Convention
 "The Last Laugh", a monologue from the 1996 album The Dark Saga by heavy metal band Iced Earth
 "The Last Laugh", a song from the 2001 album Saviour by UK band Antimatter
 "The Last Laugh", a song from Mark Knopfler's 2000 album Sailing to Philadelphia
 "Last Laugh", a song by Blind Melon from For My Friends
 "Last Laugh", a song by Chino XL and B-Real from I Told You So

Other uses
 Scroggs The Last Laugh, a 1929 experimental aircraft
 The Last Laugh (comedy venue), a comedy club in Melbourne, Australia

See also 

 Laugh (disambiguation)
 The Last Man (disambiguation)